Fazer is one of the largest corporations in the Finnish food industry. The company was founded by Karl Fazer in 1891, as a "French-Russian confectionery" in central Helsinki. Today, it employs over ten thousand people across Finland, Sweden, Russia, Denmark, Norway, Estonia, Latvia, Lithuania and Japan. Its products are exported to almost 40 countries.

History 
Fazer formed a partnership with United Biscuits in its Fazer Keksit (which made biscuits) and UB owned 70 per cent of it until 2000.

Fazer has historically acquired several other companies, including the Finnish Chymos and the Danish Perelly. The confectionery line was merged with its Swedish competitor Cloetta in 2000, to become Cloetta Fazer, though the merger lasted only until 2008 before the two brands were separated back to independent companies. Later, Fazer Keksit was sold to Danone. It was renamed to LU Suomi, the entirety of which was bought back by Fazer in 2012 from Kraft Foods Inc. (now Mondelez International) and now operates under Fazer Confectionery.

November 2016 saw the opening of a  Visitor Centre at their confectionery factory at Fazerintie in Vantaa. The avant-gardist building, in the shape of two circles with a botanical garden at the centre of one of them, was designed by K2S Architects. The Visitor Centre also includes a café, congress wing and shop.

In the summer of 2019, Fazer bought the Finnish company Kaslink Foods, which specializes in plant-based foods. According to Fazer, it sought a stronger focus on consumer products through the acquisition and saw growth opportunities, especially in the oat-based products that Kaslink manufactures. Just a few days earlier, Fazer had announced that it would sell its Fazer Food Services restaurant operations to the British Compass Group as part of the company's strategy focused on consumer products.

Following the 2022 Russian invasion of Ukraine, Fazer sold its Russian business to bakery firm Kolomenskij.

Corporate affairs

Business areas and management 
Fazer employs around 200 people in six countries in group management and shared services. Group management includes communications, legal, HR, finance and treasury, risk management, security, investment management, corporate planning, property management and internal audit. Shared services include IT, accounting and human resources.

In March 2014, the Fazer Group was divided into three business areas and two business units. The business areas are Fazer Bakeries, Fazer Confectionery and Fazer Food Services, while the business units are Fazer Cafés and Fazer Mylly. Fazer's production is divided into five major areas: Bakeries, Confectionery, Lifestyle Foods, Food Services and Retail.

Products and services

Products 
Fazer's most notable products include its classic Fazer Blue milk chocolate, widely regarded as one of Finland's most respected brands and a part of Finnish cultural heritage and cuisine. Other well-known Fazer products include their salmiakki products, such as Fazer salmiakki, Tyrkisk Peber and salmiakki-flavoured Fazer Blue.

Fazer Bakery 
Fazer operates 19 large-scale bakeries across Finland, Sweden, Russia and the Baltics and exports its bakery products to 21 countries. In addition to these, Fazer operates 64 small-scale in-store bakeries in large Finnish supermarkets. In 2018, Fazer's cricket bread won the Bronze Lion in the Sustainable Development Goals section of the Cannes Lions International Festival of Creativity.

Fazer's bakery brands include Oululainen, Skogaholm, Hlebnyi Dom, Druva and Gardesis. Fazer produces its biscuits in Vantaa, and its biscuit brands in Finland include Jyväshyvä, Domino, Jaffa, Fasupala, Carneval, Suklaalehti, Muro and Hangon. Fazer's Lappeenranta bakery produces Karelian pies. Fazer's Karelian pies are Rukiinen piirakka, Rukiinen Imatran Riisipirakka, Vuoksen piirakka, Rukiinen Perunapiirakka and Rukiinen Porkkanapiirakka. In April 2016, Fazer was reported to have bought back the Domino, Jaffa and Fanipala brands.

Fazer Confectionery 

Fazer is the leading producer of chocolates, sweets and biscuits in Finland with a market share of 30-40%. The Confectionery division has production facilities in Vantaa, Lappeenranta and Karkkila and operations in the entire Baltic Sea region. Confectionery is sold in more than 40 countries. 

Fazer's confectionery factories in Finland are located in Karkkila (chewing gum), Lappeenranta (sugar confectionery) and Vantaa (chocolates). The company produces 25,000 tonnes of chocolate per year. It became a member of the World Cocoa Organization in 2005.

Confectionery brands

Fazer Lifestyle Foods 
The Lifestyle Foods division produces other food items, such as Froosh smoothies, Fazer Yosa oat products and non-dairy drinks as well as Frebaco and Fazer Alku oat-based breakfast foods. These are produced in Lahti, Lidköping and Kaarina.

Fazer Food Services 
The Food Services division operates more than 1,100 restaurants and cafés across Finland, Sweden, Norway and Denmark under the brands Amica, Blue, Fazer and wip. Most of these restaurants serve as workplace and school cafeterias and also include private and public sector staff restaurants, student restaurants, congress, meeting and on-demand restaurants, and catering services for schools and public institutions.

In June 2019, the British giant Compass Group announced that it would acquire Fazer Food Services.

Fazer Retail 
The Retail division operates Fazer Cafés in Finland and Gateau bakery shops in Finland and Sweden. The flagship Fazer Café is on Kluuvikatu in Helsinki, opened in 1891. It is a rare example of Art Deco design in Finland.

See also
CloettaFazer AB

References

External links
 
 Fazer Group home page

 
Finnish chocolate companies
Food and drink companies established in 1891
Food and drink companies of Finland
Finnish brands
Manufacturing companies based in Helsinki
1891 establishments in Finland